Knights of Sidonia is an anime series based on the manga of the same name by Tsutomu Nihei, and produced by Polygon Pictures. Directed by Kobun Shizuno, assisted by Hiroyuki Seshita, with scripts by Sadayuki Murai and character design by Yuki Moriyama. The series tells the story of Nagate Tanikaze, an "under-dweller" destined to become a Garde pilot, whose mission is to defend the massive spaceship Sidonia from a hostile alien species called Gauna. A second season aired from April 10, 2015 to June 26, 2015. On June 16, 2017, a third season for the series was confirmed to be in development by director Hiroyuki Seshita.

Series overview

Episode list

Knights of Sidonia (2014)

Knights of Sidonia: Battle for Planet Nine (2015)

References

Knights of Sidonia
Knights of Sidonia